Edward Miall (8 May 1809 – 30 April 1881) was an English journalist, apostle of disestablishment, founder of the Liberation Society, and Liberal Party politician.

Life
Miall was born at Portsmouth. He was Congregational minister at Ware, Hertfordshire (1831) and Leicester (1834), and in, 1841 founded The Nonconformist, a weekly newspaper in which he advocated the cause of disestablishment. 
Miall saw that if the programme of Nonconformity was to be carried through it must have more effective representation in Parliament. 
One of the first fruits of his work was the entrance of John Bright into parliamentary life; and by 1852 forty Dissenters were members of the House of Commons. 
This was due largely to the efforts of the British Anti-State-Church Association, which Miall was instrumental in founding in 1844; it was renamed in 1853 the Society for the Liberation of Religion from State Patronage and Control, known for short as the Liberation Society. 

It was never able to secure a Parliamentary majority for disestablishment of the Church of England but the long fight for the abolition of compulsory church-rates was finally successful in 1868, and then in 1870 Miall was prominent in the discussions aroused by the Education Bill. He was at this time Member of Parliament for Bradford (1860–1874), having previously sat for Rochdale from 1852 to 1857. In 1874 he retired from public life, and received from his admirers a present of ten thousand guineas. He died at Sevenoaks.

References

Attribution
 
 Obituary of Edward Miall, from The Bradford Observer

External links 

 
 
 
 

1809 births
1881 deaths
Church of England disestablishment
English male journalists
Liberal Party (UK) MPs for English constituencies
UK MPs 1852–1857
UK MPs 1868–1874
Members of the Parliament of the United Kingdom for Rochdale
Politicians from Bradford
19th-century British journalists